Bourbon Township is one of ten townships in Boone County, Missouri, USA. As of the 2012, its population was 2,729. The township's major city is the railroad town of Sturgeon.

History
Bourbon Township was established in 1854. The township took its name from the community of Bourbon.

Geography

The township contains one incorporated settlement: Sturgeon. The unincorporated communities of Riggs and Rucker are also within the bounds. There are at least seven major cemeteries located within its bounds: Robinson, Riggs Union, Sturgeon, Palmer, Far West, Fountain, and Sims (Mt. Carmel). The two largest waterways are the Roche Perche, and Silver Fork Creek. In addition, Kile Creek, Sugar Creek, Little Creek, and the Thompson Branch flow through the area.

References

External links
City-Data.com

Sturgeon, Missouri
Townships in Boone County, Missouri
Townships in Missouri